Magnesia  Sipylum ( or ; modern Manisa, Turkey) was a city of Lydia, situated about 65 km northeast of Smyrna (now İzmir) on the river Hermus (now Gediz) at the foot of Mount Sipylus. The city should not be confused with its older neighbor, Magnesia on the Maeander, both founded by colonists from the Greek region of Magnesia.

The first famous mention of the city is in 190 BC, when Antiochus the Great was defeated in the battle of Magnesia by the Roman consul Lucius Cornelius Scipio Asiaticus. It became a city of importance under Roman rule and, though nearly destroyed by an earthquake in the reign of Tiberius,  was restored by that emperor and flourished through the Roman empire. It was an important regional centre through the Byzantine Empire, and during the 13th-century interregnum of the Empire of Nicea. Magnesia housed the Imperial mint, the Imperial treasury, and served as the functional capital of the empire until the recovery of Constantinople in 1261. Magnesia was one of the few towns in this part of Anatolia which remained prosperous under the Turkish rule.

Landmarks 
 
There are two famous relics of antiquity.  The first is the Niobe of Sipylus (Aglayan Kaya), a natural rock formation, on the lowest slopes of the mountains in the middle of town.  The second is the Suratlu Tash, a colossal stone carving allegedly portraying Cybele,  about 100 meters up the mountain about 6 km east of the town. This is a colossal seated image cut in a niche of the rock, of Hittite origin, and perhaps that called by Pausanias the very ancient statue of the Mother of the Gods, carved by Broteas, son of Tantalus, and sung by Homer.  It can be seen by driving into a parking lot at a children's playground.

Near the carving lie many remains of a primitive city, and about a kilometer east is the rock-seat conjecturally identified with Pausanias's Throne of Pelops. There are also hot springs and a sacred grotto of Apollo. Parts of the major fortifications built during the Empire of Nicea remain evident.

Magnetism 
One of the regions colonized by the Magnetes was a primary source for mysterious stones that could attract or repel each other, possibly leading to the modern term for magnets and magnetism.  Some suggest that it was Magnesia ad Sipylum, others that it was the Magnesia regional unit in Thessaly; this has been debated both in modern times and in antiquity without resolution.

Bishopric
The town had a bishop in late antiquity, suffran to the bishop in Ephesus.
Known bishops include:
Eusebius, at the Council of Ephesus (431)
 Alexander, at the Council of Chalcedon (553)
 Stephen at the Council of Constantinople (680) 
 Basil at the second council of Nicæa (787)
 Athanasius at Constantinople (869); 
 Luke fl 879.

See also 
 List of ancient Greek cities

References

Footnotes

Hellenistic colonies in Anatolia
Former populated places in Turkey
History of Manisa Province
Populated places in ancient Lydia
Catholic titular sees in Asia